Dalyare fort is an open-top Dhulbahante garesa of the Darawiish era which was ordered built by the Dervish as a strategy for countering the colonization efforts of the Europeans .  The building is located in the Nugaal Valley a few miles east of Las Anod. The purpose of the Dalyare fort was to serve as a refuge and escape route for Darawiish retreating from colonial forces who intend to head south towards the Shabelle River. However, retrospectively, some analysts have described the building as a setback to the previous tactic of maneuverability on the part of the Darawiish. Cali Jalax was the builder. The native Darawiish referred to the building as Sool-Daryare. On the other hand, the colonialists who launched attacks against the Darawiish referred to the building as Dariali.

Abandonment
The book Ferro e fuoco in Somalia by former Italian Somalia governor Francesco Caroselli, it records the causes and circumstances of the Darawiish abandonment of Dalyare and other forts. The letter, originally in Arabic, but since translated to Italian and Somali records correspondance between the Sayid and the Italian Somali governor Giacomo De Martino stating that the forts were abandoned because the Dhulbahante tribe, one of the clans the Dervishes comprised, had by and large surrendered.

References

Castles in Somalia